Telecanal is a private owned TV channel of Chile, launched on December 5, 2005. It currently airs in Santiago on VHF channel 2. The station for the channel mostly airs American films and TV series.

History

Launch (2005–2010)
Following the shutdown of Rock & Pop Television due to economic and audience issues, VidaVisión started to buy Edu Comunicaciones (now Televisión Interactiva), who at the time controlled Vía X, Zona Latina, and ARTV in order to remain on the air for at least 8 hours per day by law to avoid forfeiture of its signal. As a result, religious programming ended up coping with the full extent of daily transmissions.

In July 2005, Compañía Chilena de Comunicaciones, the owner of the frequency, announced that it would sell the channel 2 concession to Inversiones Alfa Tres SA, led by Jaime Cuadrado (former commercial manager of Canal 13 and personal friend of Don Francisco) for CLP 2.7 million; the sale became final in September of that year.

The channel began its official broadcasts on Monday, December 5, 2005. Its broadcasts through cable television began on January 1, 2006 through the networks of VTR and on January 10 on Coltrahue TV, in June, the channel began broadcasting on satellite through Telefónica TV Digital and in December through Gtd, on March 23, 2010, it reached Claro TV's cable network.

Initially, the channel had small live slots of no more than 30 minutes in length, while the bulk of its programming was based on foreign series, cartoons (Telemonitos), films and telenovelas, mainly from Mexico, Colombia and Argentina. With just one year on air, new programs came to light such as the sports space Como en la radio, the magazine Cocinados and the talk show Canal Abierto. Among their main faces were Daniel Valenzuela, Carolina Correa, Milton Millas and Carla Ballero.

In mid-October 2008, and as a result of the worldwide financial crisis, the television company decided to remove a large part of its national programming, which was mostly carried out by external producers, leaving its most emblematic program "Cocinados" on the screen, together with Conspiración Copano, Hiperconectados, Pago x ver, Pura noche and Mundo Motor. Its newscast, En Línea, was transferred to 11pm with a half-hour edition, while the films that occupied the primetime slots in "Cine de estrellas", moved to 8pm.

2009 starts with the return of Pura Noche but with Alfredo Alonso as its host, who joins the station, as well as Krishna Navas, who later would have her talk show with female themes ("Only them"), along with Pamela Díaz, Liliana Ross and Matilda Svensson. "Jugados" and "Actualidad central" are also created.

As of April 2009, the network's reach increases its coverage towards the Chilean Antarctic.

On November 16, 2009, the station's first late show debuted, "Influencia humana", which incorporated Pablo Zúñiga into the channel. The space was well received by the public, and great faces of the country were interviewed, such as drivers Felipe Camiroaga and Vivi Kreutzberger.

Early 2010s
In early January 2010, Telecanal first part with a journalist, Sergio Molleda, in a presidential debate Anatel. A few days after the debate made the news "Online" driving was stopped issuing Molleda. In late February, "Human influence" and canceled weeks later, the same thing happened with "Only they," and again, the programming focuses on packaged content.

In September 2010 you begin to build a sports area for the transmission of the UEFA Europa League, replacing the network that it had issued in the previous season, and Monday through Friday at midnight Hello sports, covering other disciplines issued other than football, like basketball, volleyball and rugby.

In November of that same year, businessman Jaime Square, then owner of the sign, closed an agreement to sell Telecanal the Mexican, a former executive of Grupo Televisa and former director of Mega Guillermo Canedo White.

In 2011, Telecanal broadcast the UEFA European Under-21 Championship, which was played in Denmark, a fact never before seen on Chilean television.

Mid 2010s
In 2013, Telecanal ends with tuning an annual rating of 0.43 rating points, even being surpassed by UCV (which reached 1.3 annual tune), the channel less seen of Chilean television. The poor results are explained only in issuing nullspaces packaged programming and live.

In December 2013 a new strip of Mexican soap operas opens at 21:00, with the premiere of A family lucky. With this decision, Telecanal decides to take the NCIS series, which is issued only on weekends.

Since January 1, 2014, José Manuel Larraín assumes the new executive director of the station.

During May of that year, every Saturday in the "Specials of Telecanal" transmitted the national series Picaflor Effect.

Since January, Telecanal began broadcasting "A3D" infomercials from Monday to Sunday, occupying the block from 8 am to 1 pm. Following the departure of its programs "A las 11" and "Teletiempo", Telecanal is dedicated only to its "Entertainers" program.

Programming
Subject from :Es:Telecanal#Producciones históricas
See also :Pt:Telecanal#Programas & :Fr:Telecanal#Émission

 A las 11 (Matinal)
 En línea (Telejornal)
 Pura noche (Juguete)
 Telemonitos (Infantil)
 Pago x ver (Concurso)
 Agenda central (Debate)

Controversy

In July 2005, Compañía Chilena de Comunicaciones (former owner of the frequency) sold the signal to Alfa Tres. Jaime Cuadrado, owner of Alfa Tres, is the former commercial manager of Canal 13 and a personal friend of Mario Kreuzberger (Don Francisco (television host)). Alejandro Martinez, owner of VidaVisión, initiated a lawsuit against Compañía Chilena de Comunicaciones alleging fraud.

Also, Jaime Cuadrado has ties with Mexican media mogul Remigio Ángel González, owner of Red Televisión. It has even been stated that González is the actual owner of the station. Ownership of more than one television station is forbidden by Chilean law to avoid a horizontal monopoly.

References

 
Television networks in Chile
Television stations in Chile
Spanish-language television stations
Television channels and stations established in 2005
Mass media in Santiago
Companies based in Santiago
2005 establishments in Chile